Patricia Lewis (born 1957) is a British and Irish nuclear physicist and arms control expert, who is currently the Research Director for International Security at Chatham House. She is also currently Co-Director of the Global Commission on Internet Governance. She was previously the Senior Scientist-in-Residence and Deputy Director at the James Martin Center for Nonproliferation Studies at Monterey Institute of International Studies (MIIS).  She was previously the Director of the United Nations Institute for Disarmament Research (UNIDIR) and the Director of VERTIC.

Biography

A dual national of Ireland and the United Kingdom, Lewis holds a BSc in Physics from the University of Manchester and a PhD in Nuclear Structure Physics from the University of Birmingham. In 1982, she was a special assistant in the Rehabilitation Centres for Children in Calcutta, India, and from 1983–86, she lectured in physics at the University of Auckland,in New Zealand, from where she also carried out research at the Australian National University in Canberra, and as a visiting lecturer at Imperial College London.

From 1986–89, Lewis was Information Officer of the London-based Verification Technology Information Centre, and its director from 1989–1997. She was the Director or the United Nations Institute for Disarmament Research (UNIDIR) in Geneva 1997–2008. She was Deputy Director at the James Martin Center for Nonproliferation Studies at the Monterey Institute of International Studies, California from 2008–2012. She is a recipient of the APS Joseph A. Burton Forum Award for "outstanding contributions to the public understanding or resolution of issues involving the interface of physics and society." Lewis was a Commissioner on the WMD (Blix) Commission, an Advisor to the Evans-Kawaguchi International Commission on Nuclear Non-proliferation and Disarmament (ICNND) and a member of the Ekeus Advisory Panel on Future Priorities of the OPCW.

Career
During the 1988–90 negotiations on the CFE treaty, Lewis was a consultant to the British Foreign and Commonwealth Office on the verification of conventional force reductions in Europe.

In 1989–90 Lewis was appointed British government expert to the United Nations study on the Role of the United Nations in Verification. From 1990–92 she was a visiting Lecturer at Imperial College London and was the 1992-3 Elizabeth Poppleton Fellow at the Australian National University.

She was chair of the UK Gulf Syndrome Study Group. She was also an external reviewer for the Canberra Commission Report on the Elimination of Nuclear Weapons, and a member of the Tokyo Forum for Nuclear Nonproliferation and Nuclear Disarmament 1998–99. From 2004 to 2006, Lewis was a Commissioner on the Weapons of Mass Destructions Commission, chaired by Hans Blix. Currently Lewis is an Advisor to the International Commission on Nuclear Non-proliferation and Disarmament (ICNND). Lewis recently served on the American Physical Society's Panel on Public Affairs (POPA) study on Technical Steps to Support Nuclear Arsenal Downsizing"

Affiliations
Lewis is a Fellow of the British-American Project and a member of Scientists for Global Responsibility.

External links

Patricia Lewis: the risk of nuclear proliferation at Interactive Essays – War in Iraq (BBC)

References

1957 births
20th-century Irish people
21st-century Irish people
Alumni of the University of Birmingham
Alumni of the University of Manchester
British nuclear physicists
British physicists
Living people
Academic staff of the University of Auckland
United Nations Institute for Disarmament Research people
Irish physicists
Council and directors of Chatham House
Irish officials of the United Nations
Women nuclear physicists